A jumbotron, sometimes referred to as jumbovision, is a video display using large-screen television technology (video wall). The original technology was developed in the early 1980s by Mitsubishi Electric and Sony, which coined JumboTron as a brand name in 1985. Mitsubishi Electric sold their version of the technology as Diamond Vision. It is typically used in sports stadiums and concert venues to show close up shots of an event or even other sporting events occurring simultaneously, as well as outdoor public places (such as Times Square, for example).

History and development
The jumbotron was invented in Japan during the early 1980s, but there is a dispute between two rival Japanese companies, Mitsubishi Electric and Sony, over its invention. In 1980, Mitsubishi introduced the first large-scale video board, the Diamond Vision, which was a large screen using cathode-ray tube technology similar to traditional tube televisions. They demonstrated the technology at the 1980 Major League Baseball All-Star Game in Dodger Stadium, Los Angeles.

Panasonic had the Astro Vision which was based on Fluorescent Discharge Tubes. These were the only three players in the large-screen industry. 

Ironically, it was Sony who introduced Daktronics to the pro and college sports world, as Sony would exclusively sell Daktronics scoreboards and controllers with their video board solutions. Eventually Daktronics replaced Sony in the space completely. 

In 1985, the term "JumboTron" was coined by Sony for its large-scale video board. The JumboTron was the brand name for the large-scale video boards originally manufactured by Sony, and is recognized as one of the largest non-projection video displays ever manufactured. Sony creative director Yasuo Kuroki, who previously helped create the Walkman, is credited with the development of the JumboTron. It was introduced at the Expo '85 held in May 1985 at Tsukuba, Ibaraki. It had a display resolution of 450,000 pixels, using a new proprietary Sony technology called the Trini-lite. It was a microprocessor-based light bulb developed by one of Kuroki's colleagues, chief Betamax engineer Yuji Watanabe. Trini-lite technology allowed screen clarity and computer control, laying the foundation for the first Sony Jumbotrons.

In December 1986 the San Antonio Spurs unvailed the first center-mounted arena JumboTron scoreboard at the now-defunct HemisFair Arena.

While the JumboTron and similar large-screen displays are physically large, they ranged from low to medium display resolutions. While the original Sony JumboTron in 1985 had a 450,000-pixel resolution, comparable to standard-definition televisions of that era, certain later models had lower resolutions. The JumboTron at the now-demolished Tampa Stadium in Tampa, Florida, measured 30 ft (9 m) diagonally, with a resolution of only 240x192 pixels, below VHS resolution. Screen size since then varies depending on the venue. The display introduced in 1985 was 40 meters wide by 25 meters tall. Newer, LED-based large screens have resolutions that are an order of magnitude greater than the early JumboTron resolution at a fraction of the cost. For example, the much publicized center-hung video board in the Dallas Cowboys' AT&T Stadium is 72 feet tall and 160 feet wide (22 m x 49 m), displaying HDTV at 1920 x 1080 resolution, 45 times more pixels.

The largest JumboTron in use was located at SkyDome (now Rogers Centre) in Toronto, Ontario, and measured 10 m tall by 33.5 m wide (33 ft × 110 ft) at a cost of US$17 million. By comparison, a similar-sized LED system sold today would cost around $3 million. The Rogers Centre JumboTron was replaced in 2005 by a Daktronics ProStar as part of a stadium revitalization project.

Sony JumboTron was the first video board ever in Times Square. It remained that way for almost ten years.

Purpose 
Originally, JumboTrons solely displayed the scores of the games via numerical displays. This then evolved into instant replays being showcased for the benefit of fans within the stadiums or arena, and in modern day, social media is heavily integrated, with fans being urged to post on various social media platforms to then have their content appear on the JumboTron screen.

Sony JumboTron's were the world's first mobile screens and concert screens. Big Mo was the first portable video screen and Genesis used the first portable video screens for concert tours in the mid-90's.

Specifications of production and design

Originally, the JumboTron was not an LED display (light-emitting diode display), since blue LEDs were unavailable at the time, and the only green LEDs available were of the traditional yellow-green variety, which were unsuitable for an RGB display. Each display consisted of multiple modules composed of 16 or more small flood-beam CRTs (cathode ray tubes), each of which included from 2 to 16 pixels composed of red, green, and blue phosphors. Sony displayed one of the earliest versions at the Expo '85 World's Fair in Tsukuba.
Eventually, JumboTron systems adopted LED technology as blue and pure green LEDs were developed. LED-based systems have about ten times the lifespan of CRT-based systems, a key reason for the change.

Genericized trademark
Although JumboTron is a registered trademark owned by the Sony Corporation, Sony stopped manufacturing the devices under that name in 2001 and the word jumbotron has since become a genericized trademark.

See also

LED display
Trinitron

Displays similar to the JumboTron include:
 Barco LED Screens
 Daktronics ProStar
 Mitsubishi Electric Diamond Vision
 Panasonic AstroVision
 Philips Vidiwall
 Toshiba TechnoRainbow

References

Further reading

External links
 
 
 

Sony products
Video
Vacuum tube displays
Stadiums
Japanese inventions
1985 introductions
Audiovisual introductions in 1985
Brands that became generic